The Pacific Station was an operating unit of the Royal Navy in the nineteenth century. It could also refer to:

 Maritime Forces Pacific, also known as the Canadian Pacific Station, an operating unit of the Royal Canadian Navy
 Pacific station (British Columbia), a train station in Pacific, British Columbia, Canada
 Pacific Avenue station, a light rail station in Long Beach, California, United States
 Pacific Squadron, a former operating unit of the United States Navy
 Pacific Station (TV series), a television series